Anette Hoffmann (born 5 May 1971) is a former Danish team handball player, two times Olympic champion and a World champion. She won a gold medal with the Danish national team at the 1996 Summer Olympics in Atlanta. Four years later she won a gold medal with the Danish national team at the 2000 Summer Olympics in Sydney.

Anette is a mother to a son Philipp and a daughter Carolin, whom currently plays field hockey at Syracuse University.

References

External links 
 
 
 

1971 births
Living people
People from Aabenraa Municipality
Danish female handball players
Olympic gold medalists for Denmark
Handball players at the 1996 Summer Olympics
Handball players at the 2000 Summer Olympics
Medalists at the 2000 Summer Olympics
Medalists at the 1996 Summer Olympics
Viborg HK players
KIF Kolding players
Olympic medalists in handball
Expatriate handball players
Danish expatriate sportspeople in Spain
Sportspeople from the Region of Southern Denmark